Raise! is the eleventh studio album by the American band Earth, Wind & Fire, released on November 14, 1981, by ARC/Columbia Records. The album spent 11 weeks atop the Billboard Top R&B albums chart and peaked at No. 5 on the Billboard 200 chart. Raise! has been certified Platinum in the US by the RIAA, Gold in the UK by the BPI and Gold in Canada by Music Canada.

Overview
Raise! was produced by bandleader Maurice White. The album marked the return of rhythm guitarist Roland Bautista, who last played upon 1972's Last Days and Time.

The LP was also reissued in 2015 with seven bonus tracks.

Singles
Off the album came the single "Let's Groove", which reached No. 1 on the Billboard Hot R&B Singles chart and No. 3 on the Billboard Hot 100 chart. A song called "I've Had Enough" also got to No. 29 on the UK Pop Singles chart.

Another song entitled "Wanna Be with You" rose to No. 15 on the Billboard Hot Soul Singles chart. "Wanna Be with You" also won a Grammy for Best R&B Vocal Performance by a Duo or Group.

Critical reception

The Philadelphia Inquirer gave a 3 out of 5 star rating, stating "And while there are no surprises here, the group offers another session of class music, fortified by strong melodies and appealing lyrics. The skilled blend of classic funk and mainstream values guarantees wide acceptance for this release. The groups shifts nicely from mellow ballads such as 'My Love' to upbeat material such as 'Let's Groove'." With a 7 out of 10 rating Fred Dellar of Smash Hits found that "White's production is impeccable; the vocals float and flare, the horns urge you onto the dance-floor and the rhythms make you stay there". Hugh Wyatt of the New York Daily News described the LP as "a real gem". With a 4 out of 5 stars rating Ken Tucker of Rolling Stone said "With each new album, Earth, Wind and Fire remain relatively true to their original sound: elaborate, neatly orchestral funk, influenced equally by American and African sources. But the band also keeps its ear to the radio. Accordingly, Raise! reflects the current wave of street-gritty black pop, from Lakeside to Rick James. Most of the tracks crank up the bass and feature rattling percussion that scrapes against the beat." Tucker added "On Raise!, White’s romanticism is slinkier, more seductive." With a four out of five stars rating Alan Coulthard of Record Mirror found that Raise! "sizzles from start to finish". People exclaimed EW&F's "New Age songs are ingenious sonic tapestries that blend tribal chants, zesty horns, brilliantly varied percussion, funky-flavored guitar rhythms and 2001-ish synthesizer sounds. Here an instrumental called Kalimba Tree melds into the LP's best cut, You Are a Winner, which has White's lead vocals bobbing and weaving with Philip Bailey's. The lyrics are mostly power-of-positive-thinking messages that might thrill Norman Vincent Peale but are no match for the music’s complexity." Richard Williams of The Times wrote "Paring away the overachievement of Faces, EW&F return to something like their best form".
Variety noted that "breathtaking production and a perscussive, non stop fusion of funk and rock power light up the entire album". Barney Hoskyns of NME said "Raise! is a thundering collection of the best noises around, urgent, controlled and meticulously glossy. Horns pump and spurt in golden ecstasy, percussion stamps and cracks through the usual mass of nibbling guitars and synthesizers, and White's voice is as strong and soaring as ever". The Village Voices Robert Christgau proclaimed EWF "turn their sparkling harmonies and powerful groove into a pure, contentless display of virtuosity". As well J.D. Considine of the Baltimore Sun wrote "Raise! puts Earth, Wind & Fire back on the rock and roll road".

Music critic Nelson George also placed Raise! in his ballot for the 1981 Village Voice Pazz and Jop poll.

Track listing

Personnel

Maurice White – lead vocals, background vocals, kalimba, drums
Philip Bailey – lead vocals, background vocals, percussion
Ms. Pluto – additional background vocals
Michael Boddicker – vocoder, synthesizer, keyboards
Verdine White – bass guitar, additional background vocals
Selene Burford – cello
Larry Corbett – cello
Paula Hochhalter – cello
Jerome Kessler – cello
Frederick Seykora – cello
Mary Louise Zeyen – cello
Assa Drori – concertmaster
James Getzoff – concertmaster
Ralph Johnson – drums, percussion, additional background vocals 
Fred White  – drums, percussion
Roland Bautista – guitar
Johnny Graham – guitar
Marlo Henderson – guitar 
Beloyd Taylor – guitar, additional background vocals 
Larry Dunn – keyboards, piano, synthesizer, synthesizer programming 
Greg Phillinganes – keyboards
David Foster – keyboards
Billy Meyers – keyboards
Wayne Vaughn – keyboards
Paulinho Da Costa – percussion 
Don Myrick – alto saxophone, tenor saxophone
Tom Saviano – additional saxophone
Andrew Woolfolk – tenor saxophone
Bill Reichenbach – trombone
Charles Loper – trombone
Dick Hyde – trombone
George Bohanon – trombone
Lew McCreary – trombone
Louis Satterfield – trombone
Chuck Findley – trumpet
Gary Grant – trumpet

Jerry Hey – trumpet
Larry G. Hall – trumpet
Michael Harris – trumpet
Oscar Brashear – trumpet
Rahmlee Michael Davis – trumpet
Alan DeVeritch – viola
Pamela Goldsmith – viola
Allan Harshman – viola
Virginia Majewski – viola
Gareth Nuttycombe – viola
Arnold Belnick – violin
Denyse Buffum – violin
Thomas Buffum – violin
Henry Ferber – violin
Ronald Folsom – violin 
Irving Geller – violin
Endre Granat – violin
Reginald Hill – violin
William Hymanson – violin 
Myra Kestenbaum – violin
William Kurasch – violin
Betty LaMagna – violin
Brian Leonard – violin
Norman Leonard – violin
Marvin Limonick – violin
Jerome Reisler – violin
Nathan Ross – violin
Sheldon Sanov – violin 
Anton Sen – violin
Arkady Shindelman – violin
Haim Shtrum – violin
Mari Tsumura-Botnick – violin
John Wittenbert – violin

Production

Philip Bailey – co-producer (7)
Tony Calvert – reissue producer 
Roger Carpenter – art direction, design
Larry Dunn – production assistant
David Foster – string arrangements (4)
Ken Fowler – recording engineer (basic tracks)
Mick Guzauski – recording engineer (horn and string overdubs), audio mixing 
Jerry Hey – horn arrangements (2, 4, 6, 8–9)
Stephen McManus – assistant engineer (basic tracks)
Billy Meyers – horn arrangements, string arrangements (1, 3, 7)
Shusei Nagaoka – illustration
Ron Pendragon – recording engineer (basic tracks)
Tom Perry – recording engineer (vocal overdubs), audio mixing
Maurice White – original recording producer
Verdine White – production assistant

Charts

Certifications

Accolades

See also
List of number-one R&B albums of 1981 (U.S.)
List of number-one R&B albums of 1982 (U.S.)
Billboard Year-End

References

1981 albums
Earth, Wind & Fire albums
Albums produced by Maurice White
Albums with cover art by Shusei Nagaoka
Columbia Records albums
ARC Records albums